Vincent Klyn (born June 30, 1960) is a New Zealand-born actor and surfer who has appeared in a number of 1980s and 1990s-era motion pictures. His most notable role was the 1989 film Cyborg directed by Albert Pyun.

Early life
Klyn (Klijn) was born in New Zealand. His family relocated to Honolulu, Hawaii and he attended and graduated from Aiea High School. He learned to surf in Hawaii. He went on to compete on the professional surfing circuit at only 13 years of age. Klyn was a competitor in the World Wide Surf tour, and was among the top five surfers in the world at that time.

Film career
His first and probably most remembered film appearance was his film debut in the 1989 science fiction action film Cyborg, as the main villain Fender Tremolo, playing opposite Jean-Claude Van Damme as the hero, Gibson Rickenbacker. According to the audio commentary on the DVD for Urban Menace, director Albert Pyun found Klyn when he saw him surfing one day, and immediately thought he would be an excellent choice to play a villain, as he had an outstanding physique and intense look.

He went on to appear in minor roles in other surfer films, like Red Surf (teaming up with George Clooney) in 1990, and Point Break (going up against Patrick Swayze and Keanu Reeves) in 1991, but with the exception of Gangland from 2000, he still got the bulk of his major roles in movies directed by Albert Pyun, like Bloodmatch, Kickboxer 2, Dollman, Nemesis, Knights, Blast, The Wrecking Crew, Corrupt, Urban Menace, and Max Havoc: Curse of the Dragon from 2004.

Other roles that Klyn appeared in were mostly noted as on-screen personalities on the Baywatch television series throughout the 1990s and the 2000s, and he appeared in the episode "Showdown" in the television series The Adventures of Brisco County, Jr.

He also had a bit role in Prey of the Jaguar as a thug working for the main antagonist Bandera.

External links

Biographical notes from Cyborg publicity department
Surf's Up LA - Vince Klyn (video interview)

1960 births
Living people
American male film actors
New Zealand emigrants to the United States